Vladimir Veber (born 20 July 1941, Omsk, Russian SFSR, USSR) is a football manager and former Moldovan footballer of Russian origin. Vladimir Veber played on the position goalkeeper to several teams, including Moldova Chișinău. After the end of his career he became a coach, leading several clubs and national teams of Syria and Lebanon. Later he served as coach of goalkeepers, including Moldova national football team. Currently is a team consultant of Milsami Orhei President.

Honours

Manager
FC Milsami
Moldovan Cup: 2011-12
Moldovan Super Cup: 2012

Individual
Master of Sports of the USSR

References

External links
 
 Statistics pe fc-irtysh.ru 
 Вебер Владимир Владимирович at the chernomorets.odessa.ua 
 
 
 
 Vladimir Veber at the divizianationala.com 
 

1941 births
Living people
Russian emigrants to Moldova
Moldovan footballers
Russian footballers
Soviet footballers
Moldovan football managers
Association football goalkeepers
FC Irtysh Omsk players
FC Zimbru Chișinău players
FC Zirka Kropyvnytskyi players
FC Kryvbas Kryvyi Rih players
CS Tiligul-Tiras Tiraspol players
FC Elektrometalurh-NZF Nikopol players
FC Elektrometalurh Nikopol managers
FC Zimbru Chișinău managers
CS Tiligul-Tiras Tiraspol managers
FC Nistru Otaci managers
FC Polissya Zhytomyr managers
Expatriate football managers in Ukraine
Expatriate football managers in Syria
Expatriate football managers in Lebanon
Sportspeople from Omsk
FC Sakhalin Yuzhno-Sakhalinsk players
Moldovan Super Liga managers